Edward Philip George Seaga  ( or ; 28 May 1930 – 28 May 2019) was a Jamaican politician. He was the fifth Prime Minister of Jamaica, from 1980 to 1989, and the leader of the Jamaica Labour Party from 1974 to 2005. He served as leader of the opposition from 1974 to 1980, and again from 1989 until January 2005.

His retirement from political life marked the end of Jamaica's founding generation in active politics. He was the last serving politician to have entered public life before independence in 1962, as he was appointed to the Legislative Council (now the Senate) in 1959. Seaga is credited with having built the financial and planning infrastructure of the country after independence, as well as having developed its arts and crafts, and awareness of national heritage.

As a record producer and record company owner of West Indies Records Limited, Seaga also played a major role in the development of the Jamaican music industry. Seaga died on 28 May 2019, on his eighty-ninth birthday.

Early life
Edward Philip George Seaga was born on 28 May 1930, in Boston, Massachusetts, United States to Philip George Seaga, who was of Lebanese Jamaican descent, and Erna (née Maxwell), who was Jamaican of African, Scottish and Indian descent. Erna was the daughter of Elizabeth Campbell (maiden name), daughter of John Zungaroo Campbell. Phillip Seaga had moved to the US seeking to take advantage of the prosperity of the Roaring Twenties, but the Wall Street Crash of 1929 scotched those dreams. Three months after Edward's birth in Boston, the Seagas returned to Jamaica. He was baptised in Kingston's Anglican Parish Church on 5 December 1930.

The young Seaga was educated at Wolmer's Boys', one of the Wolmer's Schools in Jamaica. He went to the United States for higher education, graduating from Harvard University in 1952 with a Bachelor of Arts (Harvard AB) degree in the Social Sciences. Before embarking on his political career, Seaga was a music producer and promoter. He subsequently took a research post at the University of the West Indies.

Music industry career
Seaga's research led to an interest in popular Jamaican music. In 1955, he supervised the recording of an album of ethnic Jamaican music. He continued to produce recordings by other artists and in the late 1950s set up West Indies Records Limited, releasing early recordings by artists such as Higgs and Wilson and Byron Lee & the Dragonaires. Beginning in 1961, Seaga lived in West Kingston. He became deeply involved in its music scene and recorded some of its artists.

West Indies Records Limited became the most successful record company in the West Indies. After being elected in 1962 as a Member of Parliament, representing the Jamaica Labour Party, he sold the company to Byron Lee. It was renamed Dynamic Sounds.

Over 16 years, Seaga worked on compiling a collection of Jamaican music covering the period from the mid-1950s to the early 1970s. This anthology,  Reggae Golden Jubilee Origins of Jamaican Music, was released on 6 November 2012 in celebration of the fiftieth anniversary of Jamaican independence.

Early political career
Seaga's political career began in 1959 when Alexander Bustamante, founder of the JLP, nominated him to serve in the Upper House of the Jamaican Parliament, the Legislative Council (later the Senate). His appointment at the age of 29 made him the youngest member ever appointed to the Legislative Council. While he was in the Senate, Seaga made his well-reported speech about the "haves" and the "have nots".

As one of the founding fathers in the framing of the Jamaican Constitution in 1961, Seaga spearheaded far-reaching constitutional reforms. He initiated a re-write of the human rights section of the Constitution, to provide for a Charter of Fundamental Rights and Freedoms; creation of the post of Public Defender; and curtailment of some of the powers of the Prime Minister to provide a better balance of power between the executive and the parliament in the Jamaican system of governance.

In April 1962, Seaga was elected Member of Parliament for West Kingston, the waterfront area in the capital city. Historically, it has been the oldest settlement in Kingston for poor, working-class residents, many of whom are unemployed. Employment is largely petty trading with some semi-skilled craftsmen. He held that seat for 43 consecutive years, until he retired, making him the longest-serving Member of Parliament in the history of Jamaica and the Caribbean region. He is the only person to have been elected as Member of Parliament for West Kingston for more than one term, and won 10 consecutive terms.

Immediately after winning his seat in 1962, Seaga was appointed to the Cabinet as Minister of Development and Welfare, with responsibility for all areas of planning, social development and culture. He initiated the redevelopment of Back O'Wall, a notorious large slum in West Kingston, and its replacement by housing, schools and community amenities, which was named Tivoli Gardens. 

Seaga also used his position to continue to promote Jamaican music.

Following the 1967 Jamaican general election, Seaga was appointed Minister of Finance and Planning. In 1964, Seaga championed the cause calling for the return of the remains of Marcus Garvey to Jamaica. However, four years later, Seaga was a part of the Cabinet of prime minister Hugh Shearer that banned Walter Rodney from Jamaica for allegedly stirring up racial hatred.

In the 1972 Jamaican general election, the PNP led by Michael Manley won 37 seats to the JLP's 16, and Shearer and Seaga were swept out of power. In 1974 he became Leader of the JLP, a post he held for 30 years; he was also Leader of the Parliamentary Opposition in various periods. In the 1976 Jamaican general election, the PNP won another landslide, winning 47 seats to the JLP's 13. The turnout was a very high 85 percent.

There was a lot of political violence in the 1970s. This allegedly started in 1975, after Henry Kissinger failed in his attempts to get Manley to stop his support for Cuba and Angola, and their fight against the armies of apartheid South Africa. According to former CIA agent turned Marxist Philip Agee, the CIA allegedly supplied arms to supporters of the JLP, and there was a significant upturn in political violence; Seaga repeatedly denied the accusation.  The 1980 Jamaican general election featured considerable violence including  running gun-battles, and would be won by the JLP in a landslide.

Prime Minister

Edward P.G. Seaga became Prime Minister of Jamaica following 30 October 1980 general election, when the JLP won a landslide victory over the incumbent PNP, with the largest mandate until 1993, when the PNP surpassed that total. Out of 60 seats contested in 1980, the JLP won 51 seats to the PNP's nine.

The mandate of Seaga and the JLP was renewed in the uncontested 1983 General Elections. He continued as Prime Minister until February 1989.

Widely regarded as the most influential Jamaican Prime Minister, Seaga was a controversial figure. His supporters claim that he 'saved' Jamaica from communism, while others assert that he 'mash up' Jamaica. Columnist and attorney-at-law Daniel Thwaites said that while these diametrically opposed sentiments run to the extremes, both are surprisingly prevalent. "It is a barometer of the lasting contentiousness and potential divisiveness of any appraisal of Papa Eddie", Thwaites said, arguing that the only other figure in Jamaican political history who could possibly be as controversial as Seaga would be his nemesis, the late former Prime Minister Michael Manley. Thwaites said, "because of their titanic decades-long confrontation, they will be forever – and, perhaps ironically – inextricably linked".

In terms of foreign policy, the Caribbean has long been seen as an unofficial "backyard" of the United States of America. In a region with such a complicated, intertwined history meshed with various world superpowers, the act of making decisions that can irrevocably effect the country is handled with care. Understanding the threat associated with communism, Seaga reversed the hands of friendship extended by Manley to Cuba and Grenada, two countries that had adopted strong anti-American stances during the Russo-American political standoff of the 70s and 80s. In an attempt to steer his country into the clear, he was forced into adopting an alliance with world leaders such as Ronald Reagan and Margaret Thatcher, Seaga cut ties with Cuba shortly after winning the 1980 election, and he, as the representative of the strongest Caribbean nation, indirectly acknowledged the Caribbean's support for the US invasion of Grenada in 1983. In doing so, Seaga is credited with preventing the eradication of Jamaica economically and saving the country from a path leading to shackling sanctions like Cuba or a foreign invasion to eliminate communism as seen in Grenada. 

In the 1980s, the Seaga administration became embroiled in accusations of a dark circle of narco-banking involving the contras of Nicaragua, the CIA and the Israeli money-launderer Eli Tisona. Seaga's Agro 21 programme was accused of involvement in cocaine trafficking from Colombia, and its Spring Plains project employed Shower Posse's Lester Coke, a.k.a. Jim Brown, as Head of Security. However, these allegations went unproven, with all investigations coming up blank.

Leader of the Opposition

Seaga served as Leader of Opposition from 1974 to 1980. The JLP was defeated in a landslide by Manley's PNP in the 1989 Jamaican general election, by a margin of 45 seats to 15, and Seaga returned to a long spell as Leader of Opposition.

Seaga went on to lead the JLP to defeat in a number of subsequent elections against a PNP led by P.J. Patterson. In the 1993 Jamaican general election, the PNP won 52 seats to the JLP's eight seats, while in the 1997 Jamaican general election, the PNP won 50 of the 60 seats available. Patterson's third consecutive victory came in the 2002 Jamaican general election, when the PNP retained power, but with a reduced seat majority of 34 seats to 26. Patterson stepped down on 26 February 2006, and was replaced by Portia Simpson-Miller, Jamaica's first female Prime Minister.

During this period of time, he suffered leadership challenges from a number of his colleagues, such as the "Gang of Five" of Errol Anderson, Edmund Bartlett, Karl Samuda, Douglas Vaz, and Pearnel Charles. In 1995, Bruce Golding left the JLP to form a new party, the National Democratic Movement (NDM).

In 2002, Golding rejoined the JLP and in November 2003 was again elected chairman of the party. He was elected leader of the JLP, and also the leader of the opposition, on 20 February 2005, succeeding Seaga.

Contributions to independent Jamaica

Economic and financial development
Seaga established many of the financial institutions required in newly independent Jamaica to build a financial market for successful economic investment and growth, including the following:
1967, first Jamaican majority-owned commercial bank - Jamaica Citizens Bank (JCB)
1968, Jamaica Stock Exchange
1969, decimalization of the Jamaican currency
1969, nationalization of financial institutions - banks and insurance companies
1969, Introduction of merchant banking
1971, Jamaica Unit Trust

1972 Jamaica Mortgage Bank

1981 National Development Bank (NDB)

1981 Agricultural Credit Bank (ACB)

1982 Agro 21

1982, Divestment Programme, commencing with lease of government-owned hotels
1984, Self-Start Fund
1985, Comprehensive Tax Reforms including a flat income tax rate for all
1985, Solidarity Programme for micro-businesses
1986, Export-Import Bank (Ex-Im Bank)
1986, De-regulation of economy, commencing with removal of import licensing; later price controls
1986, Privatization of financial institutions - NCB
1987, JAMPRO (formerly JNIP)
1988, Digiport - first satellite telecommunications data processing operation  - Montego Bay
1988, One Million Trees Programme

Planning and development
Rural and urban planning and the environment have been prime areas of development in Seaga's career. He has focused on waterfront development in the main coastal towns and cities, rural and urban township development programmes, and the development of parks and markets. They included the following:

1963, 5-Year Development Plan
1966, Redevelopment of Kingston Waterfront
1967, Comprehensively planned urban communities - runs out the rasta from the Back-o-Wall community claiming to redevelop as Tivoli Garden, a modern, fully planned urban development; Hellshire Hills development; Torrington Park
1967, Reclamation and development of Ocho Rios Waterfront (Turtle Beach)
1968 Urban Development Corporation

1969 Comprehensive development plan for infrastructure of many rural towns (later CRDTDP)

1971 20-Year Physical Development Plan

1983 National Conference Centre -  headquarters of the International Seabed Authority

1983 National Committee for Drug Abuse

1985 MPM - Beautification and Public Cleansing

1988 Reclamation of Montego Bay Waterfront

1988 Negril development (Bloody Bay)

1988 Social Well-being Plan

Various Times Land Bank - purchase of 50,000 acres of prime properties for future development (Negril, Orange Bay, Auchindown, Mt. Edgecombe, Seville, Laughing Water, Belmont (Dunns River), Winifred Rest Home property, Caymanas).

Various Times Development of several hotels - Kingston Waterfront, Ocho Rios, Negril.

Social programmes

Seaga was the architect of a wide range of social programmes which expanded training in human resources, aided small enterprises and protected the poor and vulnerable.

1963 Construction of the National Arena

1963 Things Jamaican - craft development

1963 Launching of the Drug Abuse Committee (later Council)

1964 100 Village Community Development Programme

1965 Community sports development on a structured islandwide basis

1965 The Golden Age Movement

1965 The National Volunteers

1970 Student Revolving Loan Fund for Higher Education

1971 National School Feeding Programme

1972 Establishment of Jamaica Racing Commission and Jockey School

1974 Institute of Mass Communication; later renamed Caribbean Institute of Media &           Communication (CARIMAC)

1982 H.E.A.R.T. (Human Employment & Resource Training)

1984 Food Stamp Programme for elderly poor and lactating mothers

1984 ARP - Administrative Reform Programme for fundamental Civil Service reforms

1985 Golden Age Home for the elderly poor

1986 L.E.A.P. (Learning for Earning Activity Programme) for street children

1988 P.A.C.E. (Programme for Advancement of Early Childhood Education)

1988 Residential Halls for UWI, UTECH and Cultural Training Centre

Cultural programmes
Seaga established in independent Jamaica most of the institutions to build cultural awareness and national identity, as well as develop arts, crafts and national heritage.

1963 Jamaica Festival

1964 Promotion to launch Jamaican music (ska) abroad

1964 Return and interment of Marcus Garvey's body at Jamaica

1964 Order of National Heroes - Garvey first named hero

1964 National Heroes Park

1965–69 - development of several museums: Arawak, Port Royal

1967 Jamaica Journal publication (Institute of Jamaica)

1967 Research and recording of folk culture

1967 Devon House

1968 National Heritage Week

1971 Design of the Cultural Training Centre (Arts, Drama, Music, Painting & Sculpture)

1972 Jamaica Racing Commission and Jockey School

1986 Establishment of the Creative Production and Training Centre (CPTC)

1988 Planned development of heritage sites (Port Royal, Spanish Town, Seville)

1988 Media Divestment Programme, to establish several small private radio stations and church television

Institutional, parliamentary, political and constitutional reforms

Seaga is recognized as the initiator of some of the most important political, parliamentary and constitutional reforms which affect governance of the country.

1961 Member of the Parliamentary Commission which drafted the Constitution for independent Jamaica

1979 Electoral reforms: structure of EAC

1986 Establishment of Contractor General proposed in 1979

1986 Media Commission

1992 Constitutional Reform: Advocate General (renamed Public Defender)

1993 Constitutional Reform: Charter of Fundamental Rights and Freedoms

1994 Several Parliamentary reforms:
to strengthen the independence of Parliament
to allow non-Parliamentarians to address Parliament on issues

1994 Money Bills tabled in Parliament to regulate money supply by law

International programmes

Jamaica is recognized for initiating several far-reaching international programmes within the Caribbean region and worldwide, due to Seaga's proposals to create new international agreements.

1974 UNESCO International Fund for the Promotion of Culture (Culture Bank)

1982 Caribbean Basin Initiative (CBI)

1986 UNDP - United Nations International Short Term Advisory Resources - UNISTAR (Manpower Bank)

1986 Caribbean Democrat Union (CDU)

1986 CARIBCAN (Canada)

Publications
Parent Teacher Relationships, University of the West Indies, 1954
"Faith Healing in Jamaica", International Parapsychology, 1955
"Revival Spirit Cults", Jamaica Journal, Institute of Jamaica
The Origins of Jamaican Popular Music
Grenada Intervention: The Inside Story, 2009
Revelations: Beyond Political Boundaries, Lectures 2005–2009
Edward Seaga: My Life and Leadership: Clash of Ideologies, Volume 1, 2009
Edward Seaga: Shaping History: Hard Road to Travel, Volume 2, 2010

Recordings
Folk Music of Jamaica (album recorded by Ethnic Folkways Library), 1978
Reggae Golden Jubilee - Origins of Jamaican Music, released on 6 November 2012

Personal life

On 22 August 1965, Seaga married Marie Elizabeth "Mitsy" Constantine, Miss Jamaica 1965. They had two sons, Christopher and Andrew, and a daughter Anabella. This marriage was dissolved in 1995.

On 14 June 1996, he married Carla Frances Vendryes. Their daughter Gabrielle was born 16 September 2002. With a Masters in Public Administration, Vendryes Seaga has a special interest in sociological research and the development of Jamaican handicraft. She founded the Solidarity project to assist the poor in small entrepreneurial enterprises. She founded an organization to assist victims of violence.

Seaga was deeply involved in cultural activities, particularly folk music and all aspects of things Jamaican. A keen gardener and amateur landscaper, he used his love for plants and flowers to develop the Enchanted Garden resort, an attraction in Jamaica.

As an athlete, Seaga played on several college and school teams: field hockey, cricket, football, rifle, tennis and swimming (diving). He participated as a member of various hunting clubs and the Jamaica Skeet Club.

Civic activities
In West Kingston, he became the president of the Tivoli Gardens Football, Basketball and Netball clubs. He then became Chairman of the Premier League Football Association and the Professional Football Association of Jamaica, with responsibility for the 12 Premier League teams and the staging of the Premier League.

Later years and death
On 20 January 2005, Edward Seaga retired as Leader of the Jamaica Labour Party, a position he had held for 30 years. He retired as a Member of Parliament after serving for 43 years in the House of Representatives, in addition to two years in the Senate. He has the longest period of continuous service of any elected representative in the Caribbean region.

With appointments to academia at the University of the West Indies, the Institute of Jamaica and the University of Technology, he became engaged in research and writing, as well as teaching and leadership.

On 28 May 2019, his 89th birthday, Seaga died in Miami, Florida, where he had been receiving treatment for cancer.

Honours and awards
1980, Fortune Magazine named him as a "Man of the Year," the first and only such accolade to anyone in this region
In 1981, Seaga was appointed by Queen Elizabeth II as a member of Her Majesty's Privy Council.
In 2002, the Government of Jamaica awarded him the Order of the Nation, the second highest honour
In 2005, the University of the West Indies awarded him the honorary title of Distinguished Fellow for Life.
He was also installed as a Fellow of the Institute of Jamaica, devoted to the arts and sciences.
That year, he was appointed as Chancellor of the University of Technology
Seaga was also honoured by several other countries:
1981, Republic of Venezuela – Grand Collar de Libertador
Republic of Venezuela – Gold Mercury International Award; and
Republic of Korea – Grand Gwangwa Medal, Order of Diplomatic Service
1982, Federal Republic of Germany – Grand Cross of the Order of Merit
1987, Mexico – Order of the Aztec Eagle

He received several prestigious international awards:
Gleaner Honour Awards:  Man of the Year, 1980, 1981
Avenue of the Americas Association, N.Y. – Gold Key Award (1981)
American Friendship Medal bestowed by the Freedom Foundation, 1982
Pan American Development Foundation Inter-American Man of the Year Development Award (1983)
Dr. Martin Luther King Humanitarian Award (1984)
United Nations Environment Programme – the Environmental Leadership Award (1987)

Seaga was appointed as a Distinguished Fellow by the University of the West Indies, Fellow of the Institute of Jamaica, and Pro-Chancellor of the University of Technology

Honorary Degrees:
University of Miami, LL.D. (1981)
Tampa University, LL.D. (1982)
University of South Carolina, LL.D. (1983)
Boston University, LL.D. (1983)
University of Hartford, LL.D. (1987)

References

External links 
Government of Jamaica Information Service Biography Page

1930 births
2019 deaths
Prime Ministers of Jamaica
Finance ministers of Jamaica
Members of the Privy Council of the United Kingdom
Jamaican members of the Privy Council of the United Kingdom
American emigrants to Jamaica
Harvard College alumni
American people of Scottish descent
American people of Indian descent
American people of Lebanese descent
American people of Jamaican descent
Jamaican people of Indian descent
Jamaican people of Scottish descent
Jamaican people of Lebanese descent
University of the West Indies academics
Jamaica Labour Party politicians
Recipients of the Order of the Nation
Politicians from Boston
Grand Crosses Special Class of the Order of Merit of the Federal Republic of Germany
Deaths from cancer in Florida